The Fort Des Moines Provisional Army Officer Training School was a military base and training facility on the south side of Des Moines, Iowa. Established in 1901, the base is notable as the place where African Americans were trained to be officers for the U.S. Army during World War I, and where women first began training for US Army service in 1942 as part of the Women's Army Corps. Surviving older portions of the base were declared a National Historic Landmark in 1974 in recognition of this history.  The fort property was turned over to the city in the 1950s, and has since been put a number of public and private uses.

Military history
There have been three forts called Fort Des Moines. Initially founded as a base for cavalry, the fort was built out beginning in 1903 with barracks, stables, officers' quarters, and other facilities for this use. In 1917 the first officer candidate class of African Americans in US military history, trained at Fort Des Moines, and received commissions. Also in 1917 a training camp for black medical personnel began, and in 1918 the fort was used for the treatment of World War I casualties.

In the 1920s and early 1930s the fort again housed military units, some cavalry, and some artillery. In 1933–34 it was used as a Civilian Conservation Corps camp. With the entry of the United States into World War II, the fort was used as a training center for women to serve in the Army's Women's Army Corps. After the war, the fort housed veteran soldiers for a time, and was turned over to the city in the early 1950s. In 1949, a portion of the old post grounds became a U.S. Army Reserve training center, which it continues to the present.

Later history
Much of the original 640-acre base was sold off for development as the city grew. The main surviving portion of the base, organized around the parade ground, is located at the northwestern corner of that land. Portions of the former base are now used as the Blank Park Zoo, and part of the parade ground has had an apartment complex built on it. Despite this, a number of the fort's buildings still stand, mainly on the southern and eastern edges of the parade ground. These buildings, including barracks, quarters, and stables, are now used for a variety of civic and commercial purposes. These surviving elements of the fort were designated a National Historic Landmark in 1974, in recognition of their role in the advancement of African Americans and women in the United States military forces.

The Fort Des Moines Museum and Education Center honors the U.S. Army's first officer candidate class for African American men in 1917, and the establishment of the first Women's Army Auxiliary Corps (WAAC's) in 1942.

See also
List of National Historic Landmarks in Iowa
National Register of Historic Places listings in Polk County, Iowa

References

External links

Fort Des Moines Museum and Education Center

National Historic Landmarks in Iowa
National Register of Historic Places in Des Moines, Iowa
Buildings and structures in Des Moines, Iowa
School buildings completed in 1917
Museums in Des Moines, Iowa
Military and war museums in Iowa
African-American museums in Iowa
Des Moines
1917 establishments in Iowa
African-American history in Des Moines, Iowa